Juan Pablo Varillas was the defending champion but lost in the first round to Thiago Agustín Tirante.

Pedro Cachín won the title after defeating Marco Trungelliti 6–4, 2–6, 6–3 in the final.

Seeds

Draw

Finals

Top half

Bottom half

References

External links
Main draw
Qualifying draw

República Dominicana Open - 1
2022 Singles